Douglas is a narrow gauge steam locomotive. It was built by Andrew Barclay Sons & Co. Ltd. in 1918. It was originally used by the Air Service Constructional Corps (RAF) then was bought in 1949 by Abelson & Co. (Engineers) Ltd. who then sold it to the Talyllyn Railway in 1953.

History

After being handed over to the RAF on 21 February 1918 the engine was first used at Manston by the Admiralty Air Construction Service. From October 1921 onwards Douglas spent most of its working life at RAF Calshot near Southampton. In April 1949 it was sold at auction and bought for £60 by an engineering company called Abelson & Co (Engineers) Ltd. In the early days of preservation, the Talyllyn Railway had contacted this and other similar firms, asking for redundant equipment. Abelson's offered the locomotive to the Talyllyn, and in return they named it after the donor, Douglas Abelson. After presentation in 1953 the locomotive was retubed and converted from 2ft gauge at Griffin Foundry, Oldbury (with the conversion being paid for by Abelson) before being taken by road to Tywyn. At the same time as the conversion the engine's buffers were changed from a single centred buffer at each end to pairs of buffers. The cab was also extended backwards by about 6 inches to allow the engine's lever brake to be replaced by a screw brake.

Although smaller than the other locomotives on the Talyllyn Railway, it has performed well and was returned to service in 1995, with a new boiler fitted, and turned out in its old Air Ministry Works & Buildings livery.

In more recent years Douglas has been painted in standard Talyllyn Railway livery of deep bronze green lined with black borders and yellow lining; however as of 2010 it was painted red, acting as Duncan from the fictional Skarloey Railway. In February 2018, to mark the centenary of both the locomotive and the RAF, it was painted RAF blue.

In fiction

All the steam-operated engines on the Talyllyn Railway appeared many times in The Railway Series books by the Rev. W. Awdry on the Skarloey Railway. In this case Douglas was the basis for the character “Duncan”.

References

External links

Talyllyn Railway locomotives
Individual locomotives of Great Britain
Preserved narrow gauge steam locomotives of Great Britain
0-4-0WT locomotives
Railway locomotives introduced in 1918
Andrew Barclay locomotives